The Ambelau people are an ethnic group who form the majority of the population of the Indonesian island of Ambelau. They also live on nearby island Buru and other islands. By ethnography, Ambelau are close to most indigenous peoples of Buru island. They number about 8,260, and speak the Ambelau language.

Ambelau people form a majority on Ambelau and each of its settlements and they inhabit the coastal areas of the island. The largest Ambelau community outside Ambelau island is the village of Wae Tawa (700 people) south-east of Buru. Its members maintain their ethnic identity and keep cultural, social and economic ties with Ambelau island. Ambelau minorities also live in other parts of Buru, on Ambon and other Maluku Islands and in Jakarta. During the Dutch colonization in the first half of the 17th century, most Ambelau people were forced to move to Buru to work on the Dutch spice plantations.

The ethnic group speaks the Ambelau language, which belongs to the Central Maluku branch of the Malayo-Polynesian languages. Most of Ambelau people also speak Indonesian or Ambonese Malay (Melayu Ambon), which is a creolized form of Malay. The vast majority are Sunni Muslims with a small fraction of Christians, and remnants of traditional local beliefs.

Most Ambelau people are engaged in farming. The mountainous terrain of Ambelau island hinders cultivation of rice, which is the major crop of the region, and therefore maize, sago, sweet potato, cocoa, coco, allspice and nutmeg are grown instead in the coastal areas. Some residents of Ambelau work at the sago plantation on Buru.  Hunting the wild pig Buru babirusa is common, but tuna fishing is mostly localized to the villages of Massawa and Ulima. Traditional Buru houses are made from bamboo, often on stilts. The roofs are covered with palm leaves or reeds, with tiles becoming progressively popular. National Buru costume is similar that of most other Indonesia peoples. Men wear sarong (a kind of kilt) and a long-skirted tunic, and women are dressed in sarong and a shorter jacket. The specificity of Ambelau clothing is the preference of red color in holiday attire, which also includes hats of peculiar shape – a peaked cap with a plume for men and dressing with panache for women.

References

Ethnic groups in Indonesia